10502 Armaghobs, provisional designation , is an eccentric, rare-type stony asteroid and Mars-crosser from the inner regions of the asteroid belt, approximately 2.6 kilometers in diameter. The asteroid was discovered on 22 August 1987, by American astronomer Eleanor Helin at the Palomar Observatory in California, United States. It was named for the Armagh Observatory in Northern Ireland.

Orbit and classification 

Armaghobs orbits the Sun in the inner main-belt at a distance of 1.6–3.0 AU once every 3 years and 6 months (1,282 days). Its orbit has an eccentricity of 0.32 and an inclination of 22° with respect to the ecliptic.

Physical characteristics 

The Armaghobs has been characterized as a relatively rare Q-type asteroid by Pan-STARRS photometric survey.

Lightcurve 

In February 2013, a rotational lightcurve of Armaghobs was obtained from photometric observations by Kevin Hills at the Riverland Dingo Observatory at Moorook, South Australia. Lightcurve analysis gave a rotation period of  hours with a brightness variation of 0.51 magnitude.

Diameter and albedo 

According to the survey carried out by the NEOWISE mission of NASA's Wide-field Infrared Survey Explorer, Armaghobs measures 2.61 kilometers in diameter and its surface has an albedo of 0.22. The Collaborative Asteroid Lightcurve Link assumes a standard albedo for stony asteroids of 0.20, and calculates a diameter of 2.97 kilometers with an absolute magnitude of 15.0.

Naming 

This minor planet was named after the Armagh Observatory in Northern Ireland. The present-day astronomical research institute was founded by Archbishop Richard Robinson in 1790. The Estonian astronomer Ernst Öpik, after whom 2099 Öpik is named, had been a long-time member of the Observatory. It is also known for the invention of the cup-anemometer by Thomas Robinson, the New General Catalogue compiled by John Dreyer, and Lindsay's Armagh-Dunsink-Harvard telescope. The official naming citation was published by the Minor Planet Center on 9 January 2001 .

References

External links 
 Asteroid Lightcurve Database (LCDB), query form (info )
 Dictionary of Minor Planet Names, Google books
 Asteroids and comets rotation curves, CdR – Observatoire de Genève, Raoul Behrend
 Discovery Circumstances: Numbered Minor Planets (10001)-(15000) – Minor Planet Center
 
 

010502
Armaghobs
Named minor planets
19870822